Singaperumal Koil is a census town located between Chengalpattu and Maraimalai Nagar in Chengalpattu district in the Indian state of Tamil Nadu.

A famous temple to Narasimha, the Padalathri Narasimhar Temple is situated in Singaperumal Koil. It is located on a small hillock off the GST road between Chennai and Chengalpattu.

The famous twin temples of Lord Siva known as Marundeswarar and Kachabeswarar are also present in Thirukachur, which is located little north-westerly to Singaperumal Koil town. Together they are considered one of the famed Paadal Petra Sthalams ("Shrines on which hymns were sung") of Thondai Naadu.

The neighborhood is served by the Singaperumal Koil railway station of the Chennai Suburban Railway Network

Demographics
 India census, Singaperumal Koil had a population of 8057. Males constitute 51% of the population and females 49%. Singaperumal Koil has an average literacy rate of 74%, higher than the national average of 59.5%: male literacy is 80%, and female literacy is 66%. In Singaperumal Koil, 11% of the population is under 6 years of age.

Attractions 

 Padalathri Narasimhar Temple

References

Cities and towns in Kanchipuram district
Abhimana temples of Vishnu
Suburbs of Chennai